The Barcelona Dragons are an American football team based in  Terrassa, Catalonia, Spain, that plays in the European League of Football (ELF).

History 
On 11 January 2021, it was announced that a new franchise in Barcelona will be one of the eight teams to play in the inaugural season of the European League of Football. The name chosen for the franchise was Gladiators Football, and the team will be coached by long-time CFL coach Adam Rita After the league announced, in March 2021, it had reached an agreement with the NFL, to be able to use the team names from the days of NFL Europe, the franchise was renamed the Barcelona Dragons.

Season-by-season

Stadium 
The Dragons are playing their home games at Estadi Olímpic de Terrassa in Terrassa, 34 kilometers south of Barcelona.

Roster

Staff

References

 
European League of Football teams
American football teams in Catalonia
Sport in Barcelona
Sport in Reus
American football teams established in 2021
2021 establishments in Spain